Barly may refer to:
 Barly, Pas-de-Calais, a commune in France
 Barly, Somme, a commune in France
 A character in Brawl Stars